The vice president of Argentina, officially known as the vice president of the Argentine Nation, is the second highest political position in Argentina, and first in the line of succession to the president of Argentina. 

The office was established with the enactment of the Argentine Constitution of 1853.

The vice president assumes presidential duties in a caretaker in case of absence or temporary incapacity of the head of state, and may succeed to the presidency in case of resignation, permanent incapacity, or death of the president. The longest vice presidential tenure as caretaker in Argentine history took place between 1865 and 1868, while President Bartolomé Mitre was preoccupied with the Paraguayan War. Seven Argentine vice presidents have succeeded to the presidency: Juan Esteban Pedernera (1861); Carlos Pellegrini (1890); José Evaristo Uriburu (1895); José Figueroa Alcorta (1906); Victorino de la Plaza (1914); Ramón Castillo (1942); and Isabel Perón (1974).

The Argentine Constitution does not provide for the replacement of a vice president should their tenure be ended for any reason, and their office was thus made vacant on seventeen occasions since 1861 (see list). 
 
The 1994 amendments gave the vice president the additional title of president of the Senate; this made the role a more legislative than executive one, with the power to vote in the case of a tie in the Senate. It also modified the vice president's term—as well as the president's—from one unrenewable six-year term to two four-year terms renewable upon reelection of the joint ticket.

A list of the vice presidents follows, including de facto vice presidents during military regimes and vacant periods. The current vice president of Argentina is Cristina Fernández de Kirchner, who previously served as the president of Argentina from 2007 to 2015.

List of vice presidents

Argentine Confederation (1854–1861)

Argentine Republic (1861–present)

Affiliation Keys

See also 
Politics of Argentina
President of Argentina
List of heads of state of Argentina
List of current vice presidents

List
Argentina, Vice-Presidents
Argentina